Asteroids have appeared in fiction since the 1800s, the first one—Ceres—having been discovered in 1801. A theory to explain the existence of the asteroid belt that was popular in the 1800s was that it consists of the remnants of a planet predicted by the Titius–Bode law to exist between Mars and Jupiter that had somehow been destroyed, and this was reflected in early science fiction works such as Robert Cromie's 1895 novel The Crack of Doom; several works of the 1950s reused this idea to warn of the dangers of nuclear weapons. Early works also tended to depict the asteroid belt as a region that must be navigated carefully lest one's spaceship should collide with one of the asteroids, one example being Isaac Asimov's 1939 short story "Marooned off Vesta"; later works mostly recognize that the individual asteroids are very far apart and accordingly pose little danger to spacecraft, the Star Wars films being an exception to this general rule. A concept of more enduring popularity is that of asteroid mining, featured in early works such as Clifford D. Simak's 1932 short story "The Asteroid of Gold"—where asteroids were often the setting of a space version of the Klondike Gold Rush—as well as more modern works like Ben Bova's 2001 novel The Precipice (part of his Grand Tour series). Another use humans have found for asteroids in fiction is turning them into space stations or habitats, often by hollowing them out, as in Robert A. Heinlein's 1939 short story "Misfit". Impact events or threats thereof are depicted in numerous works such as Arthur C. Clarke's 1993 novel The Hammer of God, and in the 1985 novel Footfall by Larry Niven and Jerry Pournelle they are outright weaponized.

References

Further reading 
 

 
Fiction about the Solar System